Howard Dwight Smith (February 21, 1886 – April 27, 1958) was an architect most known for his designs of Ohio Stadium (completed in 1922) for which he was awarded the American Institute of Architects Gold Medal for Public Building Design.

Early life and education 
Howard Dwight Smith was born in Dayton, Ohio on February 21, 1886, as the third child of Andrew Jackson Smith and Nancy Evaline Moore, and was named after the evangelist Dwight Moody. His father, a Civil War Hundred Days Man, had been a farmer (in Logan County, Ohio and Kansas), a teamster and salesman for a flour milling company (in Dayton), and minor political figure (elected to the Dayton Board of Education).

Smith graduated from Steele High School in Dayton and graduated in 1907 from Ohio State University with a degree in Civil Engineering in Architecture. He studied architecture at Columbia University. In 1909, he worked for one year as an architectural draftsman in the Office of the Supervising Architect in Washington, DC before returning to Columbia to receive his Bachelor of Architecture degree in 1910.

Career 
At Columbia, he won the $1,100 Perkins Traveling Fellowship and traveled and studied in Europe for 10 months in 1911, mainly in Italy. He had associated with the firm of John Russell Pope after graduation, and returned from Europe to rejoin Pope's firm in November 1911 where he became the chief designer, working on the Vanderbilt mansion on Long Island and the New York Fifth Avenue mansion of Henry Clay Frick of Carnegie Steel Company.

He continued his association with Pope until he was persuaded to come to Columbus, Ohio to design the new football stadium about 1917. While he was designing and overseeing the construction of Ohio Stadium, he was also a Professor of Architecture at Ohio State for three years from 1918 to 1921. Ohio Stadium was then the largest two level, open ended stadium in the world. He then took a position as chief architect for the Columbus Public Schools. Later he returned to Ohio State where he served as University Architect from October 1929 to June 1956.

As his mentor Pope had done at Yale University, Smith revised a long term campus master plan for The Ohio State University. He proposed to extend the campus beyond the Olentangy River. Over his career as University Architect at Ohio State, especially in the post-World War II years, he designed or oversaw design and planning of some thirty University buildings, including the expansion of the landmark William Oxley Thompson Memorial Library, which dominates the main University landscape on the Oval. Among these were Hughes Hall (music), the Alpheus W. Smith Laboratory (physics), the Agricultural Laboratories, the optometry building, and especially the St. John Arena and French Field House. The task of designing and overseeing the construction of so many new buildings in those years became such that some outside architects were engaged for the purpose as, for example, with the Ohio Union, Mershon Auditorium, and most of those in the Medical Center complex. Smith-Steeb Hall is named after Dwight Smith and Carl E. Steeb.

Smith was in continual demand as a consultant for various agencies or on specific projects including Wittenberg College, the Upper Arlington Board of Education, the Columbus and Springfield Y.M.C.A.’s, the Deshler Hotel (Columbus), the million-dollar First Congregational Church, Columbus (where he represented the John Russell Pope office), the Springfield Masonic Temple, the Marietta and Columbus City Halls and Columbus West High School.

His work was also part of the architecture event in the art competition at the 1932 Summer Olympics.

Notable works
Works by Dwight Smith in Columbus include:

 Fairwood Elementary School
 Indianola Junior High School
 Lincoln Park Elementary School
 Open Air School
 Linden-McKinley High School
 Columbus Alternative High School
 West High School
 Courtright Elementary School
 Orton Memorial Laboratory
 Poindexter Village (consulting architect)
 Royal York Apartments
 Cooper Stadium
 Former West High School addition

At the Ohio State University
Buildings at Ohio State include:
 Ohio Stadium
 St. John Arena
 William Oxley Thompson Memorial Library tower
 Pomerene Hall
 The Faculty Club
 Baker Hall
 Smith Laboratory
 Hughes Hall
 French Field House

Outside Columbus
 Jones Middle School, Upper Arlington, Ohio
 Masonic Temple, Springfield, Ohio

Personal life 
Dwight Smith married Myrna Cott of Columbus, Ohio, January 29, 1912. They had five children - Marjorie, Jackson, Howard, Myrna and Priscilla. After the death of his first wife, he married Mary Edith Thompson Gramlich, a widow with two daughters, Sybil and Jane, January 17, 1936. He resided in New York City from 1908 to 1917 and in Upper Arlington, Ohio until his death. An enthusiastic Buckeyes football fan, for years he had seats in Ohio Stadium in the row behind fellow Daytonian Orville Wright, another enthusiastic fan. Smith's grandchildren include the motion picture actress Beverly D'Angelo and the jazz musician Jeff D'Angelo. He is the father-in-law of Gene D'Angelo, former president of WBNS stations in Columbus, Ohio.

See also
 Architecture of Columbus, Ohio

References

Sources
Ohio State University - Construction of Ohio Stadium
Virginia Evans McCormick. Educational Architecture in Ohio: From One-room Schools and Carnegie Libraries to Community Education Villages Kent State University Press, 2001

External links 

 The Birth of Ohio Stadium, The Men Behind the Stadium, WOSU-TV

1886 births
1958 deaths
Architects from Ohio
Architects from Columbus, Ohio
Austin E. Knowlton School of Architecture alumni
Artists from Columbus, Ohio
Artists from Dayton, Ohio
Olympic competitors in art competitions
Sports venue architects